Michael A. Dillon (September 29, 1839 to October 6, 1904) was an American soldier who fought in the American Civil War. Dillon received the country's highest award for bravery during combat, the Medal of Honor, for his action during the Battle of Williamsburg in Virginia on 5 May 1862 and the Battle of Oak Grove in Virginia on 25 June 1862. He was honored with the award on 10 October 1889.

Biography
Dillon was born in Chelmsford, Massachusetts on 29 September 1839. He enlisted into the 2nd New Hampshire Infantry as a private. He died on 6 October 1904 and his remains are interred at the Arlington National Cemetery in Virginia.

Medal of Honor citation

See also

List of American Civil War Medal of Honor recipients: A–F

References

1839 births
1904 deaths
People of New Hampshire in the American Civil War
Union Army officers
United States Army Medal of Honor recipients
American Civil War recipients of the Medal of Honor